Belmont Park is a major thoroughbred horse racing facility in the northeastern United States, located in Elmont, New York, just east of the New York City limits. It was opened on May 4, 1905.

It is operated by the non-profit New York Racing Association, as are the Aqueduct Racetrack and Saratoga Race Course. The group was formed in 1955 as the Greater New York Association to assume the assets of the individual associations that ran Belmont, Aqueduct, Saratoga, and the now-defunct Jamaica Race Course.

Belmont Park is typically open for racing from late April through mid-July (known as the Spring meet), and again from mid-September through late October (the Fall meet). It is widely known as the home of the Belmont Stakes in early June, regarded as the "Test of the Champion", the third leg of the Triple Crown.

Along with Saratoga Race Course in Upstate New York, Keeneland and Churchill Downs in Kentucky, and Del Mar and Santa Anita in California, Belmont is considered one of the elite racetracks in North America.

The race park's main dirt track has earned the nickname, "the Big Sandy," given its prominent overall dimensions  and the deep, sometimes tiring surface. Belmont is also sometimes known as "The Championship Track" because almost every major champion in racing history since the early 20th century has competed on the racecourse – including all of the Triple Crown winners. Belmont Park, with its big, wide, sweeping turns and long homestretch, is considered one of the fairest racetracks. The Hall of Fame champion Easy Goer graces the cover of the 2005 book, Belmont Park: A Century of Champions, with paintings by Richard Stone Reeves and text by Edward L. Bowen. The book chronicles seventy racehorses who competed from 1905 to 2005 thrilling fans, setting records, and becoming legends at the venerable New York track.

Belmont hosted its largest crowd in 2004, when 120,139 saw Smarty Jones upset by Birdstone in his Triple Crown bid.

History

Old Belmont Park 
August Belmont Jr. and William Collins Whitney, along with other investors, built the original Belmont race track which opened on May 4, 1905. Arthur Underhill was hired as Engineer and Landscape Architect to design and oversee construction of the park. In its first 15 or so years, Belmont Park featured racing clockwise, in the "English fashion"—allowing the upper-class members of the racing association and their guests to have the races finish in front of the clubhouse, just to the west of the grandstand. (A "field stand," at what was then the top of the stretch, was located east of the grandstand). The original finish line was located at the top of the present-day homestretch. In his 1925 book, "The Big Town", Ring W. Lardner refers to the then-recent directional change when he has a character at Belmont say (speaking of a recent race) "At that time, they run the wrong way of the track, like you would deal cards".

A later innovation was created by Joseph E. Widener, who took over track leadership when August Belmont II died in 1924: the Widener Chute. It was a straightaway of just under  that cut diagonally through Belmont's training and main tracks, hitting near the quarter-pole of the main track; the course was removed in 1958.

Two features of Old Belmont Park remain today. First is the display of four stone pillars on Hempstead Turnpike, a gift from the mayor and park commissioners of Charleston, South Carolina. The pillars had stood at the entrance of the Washington Course of the South Carolina Jockey Club in Charleston, which operated from 1792 to 1882. The stone pillars are now found at the clubhouse entrance. Lesser known but more visible are the racing motif iron railings seen partially bordering the walking ring. The railings, used as decoration on the south side of the old Belmont grandstand, were salvaged during the 1963 demolition.

The original Belmont Park was not only unprecedented in its size but also had the then-new innovation of a Long Island Rail Road extension from the Queens Village station, running along the property, tunneling under Hempstead Turnpike, then terminating on the south side of the property. The train terminal was moved to its present location north of the turnpike after the 1956 season.

Near the railroad terminal was yet another track—Belmont Park Terminal, a steeplechase course operated by United Hunts until 1927.

In addition to racing history, Belmont Park made history in another industry native to the Hempstead Plains – aviation. Some 150,000 people were drawn to the track on October 30, 1910, at the climax of a Wright Brothers-staged international aerial tournament, which had started eight years earlier. The event came at the beginning of a period (1910, 1911, and 1912) in which racing was outlawed in New York State.

Eight years later, Belmont and aviation were reunited when the racetrack served as the northern point of the first U.S. air mail route, between the New York area and Washington, D.C.

Today, two displays in the clubhouse of the current Belmont Park commemorate the history of the racetrack: a long mural by Pierre Bellocq featuring the dominant jockeys, trainers and racing personalities of the track's history; and a series of paintings of Old Belmont Park that were featured at a nearby restaurant before the eatery closed.

Later history 
The last race at the old Belmont Park was run in October 1962. The following spring, NYRA Chairman James Cox Brady announced that two separate engineering surveys found the grandstand/clubhouse was unsafe due to age-induced structural defects and needed to be rebuilt. The book Belmont Park: A Century of Champions noted the comment of NYRA President Edward T. Dickinson: "When you sighted down the stands, you could see some of the beams were twisted. They were in something of an S-shape."

The old structure was demolished in 1963. The new grandstand was built 1964–1968. (The Inner Turf Course was also added during this time.) The Belmont race meetings were moved to Aqueduct Racetrack in South Ozone Park, Queens, during that time.

The new $30.7 million Belmont Park grandstand, designed by Arthur Froehlich, was opened May 20, 1968, and is the largest in Thoroughbred racing. It has a total attendance capacity of more than 100,000, with the adjoining backyard being able to accommodate more than 10,000. The seating portion totals nearly 33,000. The smaller, more cramped Churchill Downs grandstand has more seats than Belmont, 51,000, but unlike Churchill and Pimlico, Belmont does not allow paying spectators to picnic in the infield.

Expansion plans 

In May 2007, reports surfaced suggesting that then New York Governor Eliot Spitzer was considering closing Aqueduct Racetrack, which is ten miles west of Belmont in Ozone Park, New York, and turning Belmont into a nearly year 'round race track when the New York Racing Association lease for all three of New York State's tracks expired at the end of 2007. According to the plans being discussed, Belmont's stands would have been heated, additional barns built for Aqueduct's 400 horses, and the track modified to accommodate winter racing. In addition, video lottery machines would have been introduced. A new entity would have operated Belmont from fall to spring while the New York Racing Association would have operated Saratoga Race Course in the summer. However, any plans the former governor might have had for the track alignment likely left office with him when Spitzer was forced to resign amid a prostitution scandal in March 2008.

In July 2017, New York State officials announced that vacant parking lots behind the Belmont grandstand had been put to tender for two area top-level professional sports teams: the New York Islanders, an NHL ice hockey team; and New York City FC, an MLS soccer team. Both teams were unhappy with their current locations (the Islanders at Barclays Center; New York City FC at Yankee Stadium) and proposed to redevelop the land into their own stadiums. The Islanders proposed an 18,000 seat sports arena,  for retail development, a 225-room hotel, and a  community center, while NYCFC's pledge included a 26,000 seat soccer ground,  for retail, a  community park, and  soccer complex: both proposals were fully privately funded and included improved parking and LIRR facilities as well. On December 20, New York Governor Andrew Cuomo announced that the Islanders project had won approval to be built. In July 2019, the plan was adopted by the Empire State Development Corporation board, and UBS Arena opened in time for the 2021-22 NHL season. The plan also included a new Elmont station on the LIRR, in addition to the hotel, arena, and retail village.

In December 2022 the New York Racing Association formally announced its intention to upgrade the facilities at Belmont to make it suitable to host year-round thoroughbred racing and training, which would ultimately lead to the closure of nearby Aqueduct Racetrack. The plans are contingent on NYRA receiving state-backed bonds to fund the construction projects at Belmont.

Important races

Belmont Stakes 
The Belmont Stakes was named after financier and sportsman August Belmont Sr., who helped fund the race, and most sources say the racetrack itself was also named for him. Other sources say Belmont Park was named in honor of his son—August Belmont Jr., a key member of the Westchester Racing Association, which established the racecourse.

The race was first run in 1867 at Jerome Park Racetrack in the Bronx. In 1937, the wrought iron gates that bore an illustration of that first Belmont Stakes were donated to the track by August Belmont II's sole surviving son, Perry Belmont. The gates are now on the fourth floor of Belmont Park's clubhouse.

The Belmont Stakes races have been run at Belmont Park since 1905, with the exceptions of 1911–12, when gambling was banned in New York State; and the 1963–67 editions, held at Aqueduct while the grandstands at Belmont Park were reconstructed. The first post parade in the United States was at the 14th Belmont, in 1880.

The 31-length victory clinched the first Triple Crown in 25 years, dating back to Citation in 1948. A statue of Secretariat is in the center of the Belmont paddock.

Another Belmont Stakes achievement is recognized by the "Woody's Corner" display in the first-floor clubhouse lobby, commemorating the five consecutive Belmont Stakes winners trained by Woody Stephens from 1982 to 1986.

Other memorable performances in Belmont Park history include the opening of the track in 1905 with the famous dead heat between Sysonby and Race King in the Met Cap. In 1923, Belmont Park was host to an international duel between the American and English champions: Zev, winner of the Kentucky Derby, against Papyrus, winner of The Derby. Zev won by five lengths in front of the biggest crowd for a match race in a hundred years.

Belmont Park was the site of the tragedy-marred victory of Foolish Pleasure over champion filly Ruffian in a 1975 match race. Ruffian broke down during the race and had to be euthanized; she is buried near the finish line in the infield at Belmont Park, her nose pointed towards the finish pole.

The racetrack was also the site of Affirmed's epic stretch duel with Alydar in the 1978 Belmont Stakes, a victory that gave Affirmed the Triple Crown; and Triple Crown winner Seattle Slew's defeat of Affirmed in the Marlboro Cup in September of that same year. The Marlboro, a key event of the Fall Championship meets in the 1970s and 1980s, included a dramatic come-from-behind win by Forego in the 1976 installment.

Officials of the New York Racing Association made a concerted effort to boost attendance on Belmont Stakes Day after the 1995 installment drew only 37,171. In 1997, NYRA and local officials put together the Long Island Belmont Stakes Festival—featuring parades, food fests and other events in surrounding communities to promote the big race. The effort succeeded in creating a buzz around the Belmont Stakes apart from the chance of seeing a Triple Crown. The 2000 and 2001 Belmonts—both run when there was no Triple Crown on the line—drew announced crowds of 67,810 and 73,857. The Belmont Stakes Festival continues to be held in communities near the track, such as Floral Park and Garden City. In 2004, a record attendance of 120,139 was on hand to see if Smarty Jones would be the first Triple Crown winner since 1978.

American Pharoah won the 2015 Belmont Stakes on June 6, and became the first Triple Crown winner in 37 years. It was announced before the race that attendance would be capped at 90,000. That year's Kentucky Derby and Preakness both set attendance records, over 170,000 and 130,000 respectively.

Early aviation tournaments 
Belmont Park also has a history of early aviation shows and tournaments that dates back to the early 1900s.

Harriet Quimby, the first USA woman to obtain a pilot's license, learned of the excitement of flight at the Belmont Park International Aviation Tournament on Long Island, New York in 1910 where she met famed aviator John Moisant and his sister.

Other key races at Belmont 
In addition to the Belmont Stakes, other major races held at Belmont have included the Jockey Club Gold Cup, the Woodward Stakes, the Suburban Handicap and the Memorial Day standby—the Metropolitan Handicap, also known as the "Met Mile." (NYRA moved the Woodward to Saratoga Race Course, in 2006.)

Two important races for fillies, the Mother Goose Stakes and the Coaching Club American Oaks, are also run at Belmont as the first two installments of the New York Racing Association's Triple Tiara series for fillies. The third is the Alabama Stakes, run at Saratoga. In years past, the New York Filly Triple Crown consisted of the Mother Goose, CCA Oaks and another Belmont race, the Acorn Stakes (which is still run at the track).

All of the above races are contested on dirt; notable turf (grass) races include the Belmont Derby, Belmont Oaks, Manhattan Handicap, Just A Game Handicap, Bowling Green Handicap, Man O' War Stakes, Flower Bowl Invitational Stakes and the Joe Hirsch Turf Classic Invitational.

Belmont's Fall Championship meet includes New York Showcase Day in late October, with seven stakes races for New York-bred horses. The richest race on that program is the $250,000 Empire Classic Handicap.

Graded events
 
The following Graded events were held at Belmont Park in 2022.

Grade I 

 Acorn Stakes
 Belmont Derby
 Belmont Oaks
 Belmont Stakes
 Champagne Stakes
 Frizette Stakes
 Jaipur Invitational Stakes
 Joe Hirsch Turf Classic
 Just a Game Stakes
 Man o' War Stakes
 Manhattan Stakes
 Ogden Phipps Stakes
 Metropolitan Handicap
 New York Stakes
 Vosburgh Stakes
 Woodward Stakes
 Woody Stephens Stakes

Grade II
 
 Bed O' Roses Invitational Stakes
 Beldame Stakes
 Belmont Gold Cup Invitational Stakes
 Brooklyn Invitational Stakes
 Gallant Bloom Handicap
 Hill Prince Stakes
 John A. Nerud Stakes
 Kelso Handicap
 Knickerbocker Stakes
 Miss Grillo Stakes
 Mother Goose Stakes
 Ruffian Handicap
 Sands Point Stakes
 Sheepshead Bay Stakes
 Suburban Stakes
 True North Stakes
 Wonder Again Stakes

Grade III
 
 Athenia Stakes
 Beaugay Stakes
 Bold Ruler Handicap
 Dwyer Stakes
 Fort Marcy Stakes
 Futurity Stakes
 Intercontinental Stakes
 Jockey Club Derby
 Jockey Club Oaks
 Matron Stakes
 Noble Damsel Handicap
 Pennine Ridge Stakes
 Pebbles Stakes
 Peter Pan Stakes
 Pilgrim Stakes
 Poker Stakes
 Soaring Softly Stakes
 Vagrancy Handicap
 Victory Ride Stakes
 Waya Stakes
 Westchester Stakes

In 2021, the Woodward Stakes and Waya Stakes were moved to Belmont, while the Jockey Club Gold Cup and the Flower Bowl Stakes were moved to Saratoga.

Belmont Park today 

Racing at Belmont Park is conducted in two annual installments, or "meetings". The "spring-summer meeting" usually now begins on the Thursday or Friday of the week before the Kentucky Derby in April and lasts through the first or second Sunday in July, depending on the start of the Saratoga meet that follows (the Saratoga meet was expanded to eight weeks in 2019).  The "fall meeting" follows the Saratoga Season, commencing on the Thursday or Friday after Labor Day and ending on either the last Sunday in October or in some years the first Sunday in November, usually dependent on the dates of the Breeders' Cup. Racing is held at Saratoga Race Course, during the time between these two meetings. Prior to 1977, a summer meeting was contested at Aqueduct from mid-June until the Saratoga meet began; its abolition led to the Belmont spring meeting being lengthened to its present duration (and eventual renaming).

The autumn installment is known as the Fall Championship meet, since many of the eventual Eclipse Award title winners have earned key victories in some of the meeting's races, such as the Jockey Club Gold Cup. Before the advent of the Breeders' Cup series in 1984, the Belmont Fall Championship races themselves helped determine the divisional championships.

Belmont has been home to the day-long Breeders' Cup championship in 1990, 1995, 2001 (the first major sports event to be held after the September 11 Attacks in the metropolitan area) and most recently in 2005.

Belmont's backyard is well known as a gathering place for racing fans to see their horses saddled before they hit the track. The center of the paddock is dominated by a white pine that pre-dated the track itself—it turned 180 years old in 2006. A stylized version of the pine has been the centerpiece of Belmont Park's corporate logo since 1968.

 The paddock area also serves as a picnic area for the increasing numbers of fans who make Belmont Stakes Day—the Saturday that falls within the range of June 5 through June 11—a tourist attraction.

Physical attributes 

The  racing, training and barn complex is located on the western edge of the Nassau County region known as the Hempstead Plains. Just a few miles (kilometers) east on the same plains, the first racing meet in North America was held in 1665, supervised by colonial governor Richard Nicolls.

Immediately inside of this is the Widener Turf Course (named after the Widener family that has a long and prestigious history in American horse racing) spanning  plus , which in turn encircles an Inner Turf Course with a circumference of  plus .

The chute used to extend further back across the training track, permitting races of up to a mile and a quarter but was shortened because a crossover is now infeasible given the clay base of the Main Track and stone-dust base of the training track. Before the 1990 Breeders' Cup, the outer rail of the Main Track was moved back to widen the middle of the clubhouse turn and soften the angle of the start of the  Classic. In March 2009, lights were added to the training track as a safety measure to prevent early morning workouts from occurring in the dark.

Geopolitical status 

The racetrack, grandstand, training, and barn facilities are located entirely in the community of Elmont in Nassau County, New York. According to the City of New York's own map portal, the Long Island Rail Road station on the property, the ramp between the grandstand and the train station, and some of the adjoining parking fields straddle the Queens County line.

Belmont Park has direct on- and off-ramps to the Cross Island Parkway, which runs north-south and is just to the west of the park. Belmont Park's physical address is given as 2150 Hempstead Turnpike (New York State Route 24).

Because the property stretched slightly into Queens, bookmakers in the track's early days — when bookmaking was illegal — could escape arrest from one county's authorities by jumping over the border. It was once even believed that horses rounding the far turn crossed into Queens and then came back to Nassau for the stretch run. After the 1956 season, the construction of a wider bus road beyond the main course's final turn forced the turn to be shortened. The current layout has the entire racing course inside Nassau County.

In popular culture

Belmont and NYRA TV personalities 
Because of Belmont's role in hosting big, nationally televised races on broadcast and cable TV, its track announcers have been among the best known in the sport. Among the famous race callers who've served as Belmont PA announcers are Fred Capossela, Dave Johnson, Chic Anderson, Marshall Cassidy, Tom Durkin, Larry Collmus and currently on a full-time basis, John Imbriale after Larry Colmus's contract with NYRA was not renewed following the 2019 Belmont Park season (Imbriale had been announcer during the Winter months while Collmus was at Gulfstream Park at that time and even after Collmus ended his time as the Gulfstream track announcer).  Imbriale is currently backed up by Anthony Stabile.

Contrary to popular belief, Johnson, not Anderson, was Belmont Park's PA announcer during Secretariat's 1973 romp in the Belmont Stakes (there is no known audio to exist of Johnson's call of that Belmont). It was on TV that Anderson called the 1973 Belmont Stakes aired by CBS Television, where he famously described Big Red as "moving like a tremendous machine". Anderson was the TV "voice of horse racing" in the 1970s and the announcer at Churchill Downs during Secretariat's racing career. Johnson went on to be TV's voice of horse racing in the 1990s.

Anderson would succeed Johnson as announcer at Belmont and the other NYRA tracks in May 1977, serving until his death on March 24, 1979. Anderson was followed by frequent backup voice Marshall Cassidy, who was the lead caller of NYRA races until Durkin replaced him in September 1990.

Sources: New York Racing Association (NYRA), City of New York

 Paul Corman (1995–1999)
 John Imbriale (1995–present)--Also the current full-time racecaller at the NYRA tracks
 Rich McCarthy (1995–1999)
 Harvey Pack (1995–1999)
 Jan Rushton (1995–2009)
  Mary Ryan (1995–1999)
 John Veitch (1995–1999)
 Mike Watchmaker (1995–1999)
 Michael Sherack (1997–2000)
 Kelly Gecewicz (2000–2005)
 Jason Blewitt (2006–2016) — Blewitt graduated from Long Island University, C. W. Post with a degree in journalism. He had been a regular co-host of Talking Horses, a daily handicapping show at NYRA tracks, since 2006. He has also been a frequent guest on New York City Off Track Betting Corporation's Thoroughbred Central.
 Eric Donovan (2006–present) — Eric Donovan has worked on the NYRA press staff since 1999 and was the full-time oddsmaker for all three New York Racing Association tracks from 2005 - 2017. He was also the co-host of NYRA's daily handicapping show, Talking Horses. Donovan, who frequently substituted in recent years, took over for Don LaPlace, who set the morning line since early 2000.
 Andy Serling (2008–present) — Andy Serling is an American television personality who works as a television analyst for Belmont Park, Saratoga Race Course, and Aqueduct Racetrack as he also makes appearances on HRTV daily for his handicapping insights. A native of Saratoga Springs, New York, he has been a familiar face and voice around New York tracks since he began following the races while still a child. As an adult, he has become known as a trenchant and highly opinionated analyst. He was the first co-host (with Mike Watchmaker) of the Talking Horses segment of the NYRA simulcast show, and currently serves as a weekend-stakes commentator on drf.com web-casts. He is also a regular guest and the Monday host of Daily Racing Forms handicapping seminars at Siro's during the Saratoga race meeting. Serling has been with NYRA's on-air team since August 2008.
 Maggie Wolfendale (2010–present)
 Anthony Stabile (2016-Present)

Comedy 
Comedian Robert Klein made Capossella's race calls the subject of one of his routines, captured on his 1974 album Mind Over Matter.

Film 
Scenes for the Woody Allen movies Mighty Aphrodite (1995) and Melinda and Melinda (2004) were shot at Belmont Park, as was a paddock scene for the 1990s remake of the film Gloria with Sharon Stone and George C. Scott.

Scenes for the movie St. Vincent (2014) starring Bill Murray were shot at Belmont Park.

Music 
Belmont has hosted a wide range of top musical acts, including Billy Joel, Kenny Rogers, Natalie Cole and Blondie. Titled the Coca-Cola Sunset Series, these fan-based events were produced by Richard Flanzer.

Television 
A January 1975 episode of the ABC sitcom The Odd Couple — entitled "Felix the Horse Player"—was filmed partly at Belmont Park, though one of the race clips on the show features the shot of an Aqueduct starting gate.

A few years later, Dick Cavett took the camera crew of his PBS talk show to Belmont for a look at horse racing.

Belmont Park was featured in an episode of Everybody Loves Raymond, in which Frank, Robert, and Ray bet on a horse named "Marie's Mouth".

Belmont Park was featured on the season finale of The Amazing Race 27.

Course record breakers 
Nasomo (foaled 1956)

See also 

 American Triple Crown
 Graded stakes race
 James Radley—English aviator

References

External links 

 
 Belmont Park Opening Day, 1905
 Belmont Stakes

 
Horse racing venues in New York (state)
New York Racing Association
Belmont family
Sports venues in Hempstead, New York
1905 establishments in New York (state)
Sports venues completed in 1905